A creed is a statement of religious belief.

Creed or The Creed may also refer to:

Places
 Creed, Cornwall, a village in England, UK
 Creede, Colorado, USA

Film
 Creed (film series), the spinoff film series to the Rocky film series centering on the character Adonis "Donnie" Creed
 Creed (film), a 2015 spin-off/sequel to the Rocky film series, starring Michael B. Jordan and Sylvester Stallone
 Creed II, a sequel to Creed, also starring Michael B. Jordan and Sylvester Stallone
 Creed III, a sequel to Creed II, also starring Michael B. Jordan

Music
 Creed (band), an American post-grunge band
 Creed (soundtrack), a soundtrack album for the 2015 film of the same name
The Creed (album), a 2004 album by Avalon
 MC Creed, a British rapper and member of UK garage group Da Click

Literature
 Creed, a horror novel by English writer James Herbert
 "Creed", a poem by Steve Turner (writer)

Government
 American's Creed
 United States Postal Service creed (unofficial)

Military
 Rifleman's Creed, also known as "the Creed of the United States Marine," though unofficial
 Ranger Creed, official creed of the US Army Rangers
 U.S. Soldier's Creed, a set of values and morals that all U.S. Army personnel are encouraged to live by
 Sailor's Creed, official creed of the U.S. Navy
 Airman's Creed, official creed of the U.S. Air Force

Companies
 Creed (perfume), a perfume manufacturer
 Creed & Company, a British telecommunications company

People with the given name
 Creed Napoleon "Frank" Bates (fl. 1898–1899), American professional baseball player
 Creed Bratton (born 1943), American singer and actor
 Creed Taylor (1929-2022), American record producer

Fictional characters
 Creed, the character from the self-titled comic book originally published by Hall of Heroes 
 Creed Diskenth, the antagonist in anime and manga series Black Cat
 Creed Bratton (character), a character from the U.S. television series The Office portrayed by the real-life Creed Bratton
 Apollo Creed, a character in the Rocky film series
 Donnie Creed, a character in the Creed film series of the Rocky franchise, son of Apollo Creed

Other uses
 Creed (surname), a surname

See also 
 Assassin's Creed, a 2007 video game
 The Creed, a 1999 video game
 Credo (disambiguation)